Hoop Life is a mixtape by American rapper Lil B. It was digitally released on June 1, 2014, through Lil B's own record label, BasedWorld Records. The mixtape mainly features basketball-themed songs.

The song, "Fuck KD", a diss track to Kevin Durant following their feud, was released on March 8, 2014 along with an accompanying music video. The music videos for the tracks, "Gotta Make the NBA", "Katy Perry" and "Hoop Life" were also released throughout April and May 2014.

Track listing
 "Pass The Ball"
 "At The Freethrow"
 "NBATV Commercial"
 "Off Da Bench"
 "Material Mindstate"
 "Pass The Roc" - Produced by NAPSZ NAPOLITANO
 "Call Me Coach"
 "Hoop Life"
 "Foul Out"
 "Peyton On Broncos, Jordan On Wizards" - Produced by JAMs
 "Hall Of Fame"
 "Marbel Floors And Pain"
 "Lockdown"
 "You're Going To The League"
 "Good Day"
 "Dont Go Outside"
 "Living My Life"
 "Ski Ski BasedGod" - Produced by Slavery & Eskay
 "Pretty Boy Anthem"
 "Only Time I Slow Down"
 "NBA Live"
 "Scouts Report"
 "Gotta Make The NBA"
 "Real Based"
 "Fuck KD (Kevin Durant Diss)"
 "NBA Stole My Swag" - Produced by 138th
 "I Got Bitches 2014"
 "Katy Perry"
 "See Me In The Game"
 "Mack Maine" - Produced by 4by4
 "Who I Want"
 "I Choose Her"
 "Clink Clink (Clean Version)"

References

External links
 
 Hoop Life mixtape on DatPiff

2014 mixtape albums
Lil B albums
Self-released albums
Basketball culture
Albums free for download by copyright owner